Caputh-Schwielowsee station is a railway station in Caputh, district of the municipality Schwielowsee located in the district of Potsdam-Mittelmark, Brandenburg, Germany.

References

Railway stations in Brandenburg
Railway stations in Germany opened in 1923
Buildings and structures in Potsdam-Mittelmark